Jupi is a municipality in the state of Pernambuco (PE), Brazil.

As of 2020, the estimated population was 14,922.

References

Municipalities in Pernambuco